Baiq Amiatun Shalihah (born 16 July 1991) is an Indonesian footballer who plays a forward for Persis Women and the Indonesia women's national team.

Club career
Amiatun previously played for Asprov NTB in Indonesia and currently plays for Persis Women.

International career 
Amiatun scored the sole goal against Singapore in the 2022 AFC Women's Asian Cup qualification and represented the national team at the 2022 AFC Women's Asian Cup.

On 22 & 26 February 2023, Amiatun scored in two matches against Saudi Arabia twice in a friendly matches.

International goals

References

External links

1991 births
Living people
Sportspeople from West Nusa Tenggara
Indonesian women's footballers
Women's association football forwards
Indonesia women's international footballers